Phillip A. Porras is a computer scientist and security researcher known for his work combating the Conficker worm. Porras leads the Internet Security Group in SRI International's Computer Science Laboratory.

He was previously a manager of the Trusted Computer Systems Department of The Aerospace Corporation. Porras holds 12 U.S. patents, and was named an SRI Fellow in 2013.

Education
Porras attended the University of California, Irvine.

Career
Porras was an author of patents involved in the 2008 case SRI International, Inc. v. Internet Security Systems, Inc.

During the Conficker worm's initial attack, Porras was running a honeypot and was one of the first security researchers to notice it; and was part of the "Conficker Cabal" that helped combat the worm. Porras' team in SRI published an extensive analysis of the worm. In 2010, Porras was a co-author of BLADE, a collaboration between SRI and Georgia Tech researchers designed to prevent drive-by download malware attacks.

Awards and memberships

Porras was named an SRI Fellow in 2013 for his long-term work in information security and malware analysis, and his recent research on OpenFlow.

References

Living people
Computer security exploits
SRI International people
University of California, Irvine alumni
Year of birth missing (living people)